Gregory Angus George (May 9, 1888 – February 2, 1942) was a Canadian professional ice hockey player. He played with the Ottawa Senators and the Montreal Wanderers of the National Hockey Association.

References

1888 births
1942 deaths
Canadian ice hockey centres
Ice hockey people from Ontario
Montreal Wanderers (NHA) players
Ottawa Senators (NHA) players
People from Renfrew County